Electronicore (also known as synthcore or trancecore) is a fusion genre of metalcore with elements of various electronic music genres, often including trance, electronica, and dubstep.

Reception
Sumerian Records noted in the late 2000s that "there has been a surplus of electronica/hardcore music as of late." Attack Attack! is often recognized as the primary American contributor of the style, being inspired by British band Enter Shikari. Enter Shikari is an electronicore band that began in 1999, adding their last member and transforming to "Enter Shikari" from "Hybryd" in early 2003,  in St Albans, England. The group has received international radio airplay and a substantial number of musical awards, from Kerrang!, NME, Rock Sound Magazine and BT Digital Music Awards. They express a relationship with electronic music genres such as trance and have been referred to as the "kings of trancecore." Their second album, titled Common Dreads, was released in June 2009 and debuted on the UK Albums Chart at 16. In 2020, metal band Bring Me The Horizon released Post Human: Survival Horror which has notable elements of Electronicore in a few tracks such as 1x1 which features duo Nova Twins.

Characteristics
Electronicore is characterized by typical metalcore instrumentation, breakdowns, and heavy use of sequencers, conventional instrument recorded-note samplers, electronic tone-generating synthesizers, auto-tuned singing, and screamed vocals. The genre often features dynamic transitions from soft electronica ballads to intense metalcore passages. However, the degree to which metalcore characteristics are incorporated may vary. In addition to electronica, the fusion may involve a variety of other electronic music genres, including techno, trance, dubstep, electro, and dance.

Related musical styles
Nintendocore is a rock music genre that includes elements of video game music and chiptune. It is a derivative form of post-hardcore.
Crunkcore is a musical genre that combines post-hardcore and screamo with crunk hip hop and characteristics of electronic music.
Digital hardcore is a music genre fusing elements of hardcore punk and various forms of electronic music and techno. It developed in Germany during the early 1990s, and often features sociological or left-wing lyrical themes.

See also
List of electronicore bands
Electronic rock
Electropunk
Industrial metal
Dance-punk
Crabcore
Trap metal
Metalstep

References

Fusion music genres
Electronic music genres
Heavy metal genres
Metalcore genres
British rock music genres